Below is a list of famous Naqshbandi saints hailing from the village of Allo Mahar and/or whose shrines are located in Allo Mahar:
Syed Muhammad Jewan Shah Naqvi (Bhaakri)
Pir Syed Muhammad Channan Shah Nuri (Naqvi Bhaakri)
Pir Muhammad Amin Shah Sani Sarkar.
Pir Syed Muhammad Hussain Shah Salis Sarkar.
Pir Syed Faiz-ul Hassan Shah
Pir Syed Khalid Hasan Shah

Gallery

References 
 Sir Thomas Walker Arnold, The Preaching of Islam
 M.J.H. Garcin de Tassy, La langue et la littérature Hindoustanies de 1850 à 1869. Discours d'ouverture du cours d'hindoustani.

Further reading 
The best known treatises and reports, written by the authors of the early period are:
 Allama Pir Saeed Ahmad Mujadadi. Mashaiekh-e-Allo Mahar Sharif. Idara-e-Tanzeem ul-Islam, Gujjranwala, Pakistan
 Allo Mahar Sharif. Kawajgan-e-Naqshband
 Kwaja Nur Muhammad Chhrahi Caliph. Arbab-e-Waliyat
 Kaliphs of Chura Sharif. Auliya-e-Pothohar
 Shaikh Ghulam Nabi. Amir-e-Karwan Syed Faiz ul-Hasan Shah
 Syed Faiz ul-Hassan Shah. Tahreek-e-Ihrar
 Rizwan Sarwar. Mashaikh-e-Maharvia
 Pir Saeed Ahmad Mujadadi. Maharvia Number

Islamic religious leaders
Naqshbandi order